BlueStacks is an American technology company known for the BlueStacks App Player and other cloud-based cross-platform products. The BlueStacks App Player allows Android applications to run on computers running Microsoft Windows or macOS. The company was founded in 2009 by Jay Vaishnav, Suman Saraf, and Rosen Sharma.

History
The company was announced in May 2011 at the Citrix Synergy conference in San Francisco. Citrix CEO Mark Templeton demonstrated an early version of BlueStacks onstage and announced that the companies had formed a partnership. The public alpha version of App Player was launched in October 2011. App Player exited beta on June 7, 2014. In July 2014, Samsung announced  it had invested in BlueStacks. This brought total outside investment in BlueStacks to $26 million.

BlueStacks (Android emulator)

BlueStacks' main source of revenue is from an Android emulator known as App Player. The software's basic features are free to download and use. Advanced optional features require a paid monthly subscription. The company claims the App Player can run 1.5 million Android apps as of November 2019. As of February 2021, BlueStacks claimed its apps were downloaded over 1 billion times. App Player features mouse, keyboard, and external touch-pad controls.

In June 2012, the company released an alpha version of its App Player software for macOS, while the beta version was released in December of the same year.

BlueStacks 2

In April 2015, BlueStacks, Inc. announced that a new version of App Player for macOS, 2.0, was in development, which was released in July. In December 2015, BlueStacks, Inc. released the new version BlueStacks 2.0 which lets users run multiple Android applications simultaneously. BlueStacks 2.0 was also available for Mac OS X 10.9 Mavericks or later, till 2018.

In April 2016, the company released BlueStacks TV which integrated Twitch.tv directly into the BlueStacks App Player. This addition allows users to livestream their apps to Twitch without the need for extra hardware or software.

BlueStacks released Facebook Live integration in September 2016, allowing users to stream their gameplay to their Facebook profiles, Pages they control, or Facebook Groups they belong to.

BlueStacks 3

In July 2017, BlueStacks released BlueStacks 3 based on a brand new engine and front-end design. BlueStacks 3 added App Center which personalizes game suggestions, an account system, chat, new keymapping interface, and multi-instance. Multi-instance allows users to launch multiple BlueStacks windows using either the same or different Google Play account.

BlueStacks 3N

In January 2018, BlueStacks announced the release of the BlueStacks + N Beta which runs on Android 7 (Android Nougat) and claimed to be the first and only Android gaming platform to have Android 7 at the time, since the majority of Android emulators ran Android 4.4 (KitKat), including prior BlueStacks versions. This beta version was powered by an upgraded "HyperG" graphics engine allowing BlueStacks to utilize the full array of Android 7 APIs.

BlueStacks 4

In September 2018, BlueStacks announced the release of its latest flagship version, BlueStacks 4. During testing, BlueStacks 4's benchmark results were at most 6 times faster than a 2018 generation mobile phone. BlueStacks 4 also includes dynamic resource management which only initializes the required Android libraries, thus freeing resources. BlueStacks 4 provides a new dock and search user interface. A new AI powered key-mapping tool auto maps keys in supported games with key customization also available for further tweaking. In addition, BlueStacks 4 supports both 32-bit and 64-bit version of Android 7.1.2 Nougat.

In January 2019, BlueStacks released a 64-bit version of BlueStacks 4 via its early access program. This version runs on a 64-bit version of Android 7.1.2 which allows for improved performance, and more efficient memory usage. The prerequisites for running this build include running a 64-bit version of Windows 8 or later, with virtualization enabled, and Hyper-V disabled. This 64-bit release allows the installation and usage of ARM64-v8a Android applications.

BlueStacks 5
In May 2021, BlueStacks released BlueStacks 5, still based on Android 7.1.2 but also Android 9 (Android Pie) or Android 11 (in beta for the moment), if chosen by user.

BlueStacks X
In September 2021, BlueStacks launched BlueStacks X, a cloud gaming service based on the Android platform. Bluestacks X uses throttling to control the speed according to a user's internet connection, under the name of Hybrid Cloud. BlueStacks X's servers are hosted by now.gg, a subsidiary of BlueStacks.

Minimum requirements

Current minimum requirements for BlueStacks App Player 5 for Windows are: Windows 7 or higher, 4 GB of RAM, 5 GB of disk space, and an Intel or AMD processor. BlueStacks clashes with the BitDefender antivirus software. Current minimum requirements for BlueStacks for macOS are: 64-bit macOS Sierra or higher, 4 GB RAM, 8 GB disk space, Intel HD 5200 or higher graphics processor, and an Intel or AMD processor. BlueStacks does not yet not support computers with Apple M1 chips, macOS Monterey, or macOS Ventura.

Criticism 
BlueStacks has been criticized for the forced installation of BlueStacks X alongside BlueStacks 5, despite the website having separate download buttons. Even if BlueStacks X is uninstalled, it returns in every BlueStacks 5 update. Around February 2023 the installer started to forcefully install a crypto wallet application from now.gg as well as an icon on the system tray which runs on startup, and cannot be disabled.Afterward, This application is renamed to BlueStacks Services.

See also
 Android-x86
 VirtualBox

References

Android (operating system)
Software companies based in the San Francisco Bay Area
Android emulation software
MacOS Internet software
Windows Internet software
Companies based in Campbell, California
Software companies established in 2009
2009 establishments in California
Software companies of the United States